Osage County is the largest county by area in the U.S. state of Oklahoma. Created in 1907 when Oklahoma was admitted as a state, the county is named for and is home to the federally recognized Osage Nation. The county is coextensive with the Osage Nation Reservation, established by treaty in the 19th century when the Osage relocated there from Kansas. The county seat is in Pawhuska, one of the first three towns established in the county. The total population of the county is 47,987.

History
During the 17th century, the Osage and other Dhegihan Siouan tribes were displaced westward from the Ohio Country following the Beaver Wars. The Osage became established as a powerful nation in the areas of present-day Missouri and Arkansas between the Missouri and Red rivers, as well as extending to the west. By 1760, they had increased their range to include the present Osage County. Historically one of the most powerful Great Plains tribes, their numbers were reduced by infectious disease and warfare after encounter with Europeans.

In 1825, they ceded their claim to the land in present-day Oklahoma to the United States government, which included it in a "perpetual outlet to the west given to the Cherokee Nation by the Treaty of New Echota" in 1835. This treaty was to accomplish Cherokee removal to the Indian Territory.  During the American Civil War, on December 26, 1861, a band of pro-Union Creek and Seminole fought with a Confederate Army unit at the Battle of Chustenahlah on Bird Creek, near the present town of Skiatook. Generally the Five Civilized Tribes were allied with the Confederacy.

In 1870, the Osage finally prepared for removal from Kansas, after having negotiated payment for their land. They purchased  of their former territory in present-day Oklahoma from the Cherokee. By owning it by title, they had a stronger position in relation to the US government than did other tribes. The Osage Agency was established in 1872 at Deep Ford, later renamed as Pawhuska. It was designated as the county seat when Oklahoma was admitted as a state. The other chief settlements in the 1870s were Hominy and Fairfax; each of the three was settled by a major Osage band.

In 1875, the US designated their land as the Osage Reservation. Because the tribe owned the land directly, they retained more control over their affairs than did tribes whose land was held "in trust" by the United States government. This reservation became part of the Oklahoma Territory under the Oklahoma Organic Act of 1890. It became a semi-autonomous district by the Oklahoma Enabling Act of 1906, and Osage County at the time of Oklahoma Statehood in 1907. At that time, there were 2,229 registered Osage members.

As owners, the Osage negotiated the retention of the communal mineral rights to their reservation lands. In October 1897, the Phoenix Oil Company drilled the first successful oil well on the Osage reservation and in Oklahoma Territory. It was located along Butler Creek. In 1901, Phoenix Oil and Osage Oil companies combined their assets to form the Indian Territory Illuminating Oil Company (ITIO). It arranged with the Bureau of Indian Affairs to sub-lease the eastern part of the Osage reservation until 1916. When ITIO's lease expired, the United States government supervised the public auctioning of leases for  tracts.

All subsurface minerals, including oil, are owned by the Osage Nation and held in trust for them by the Federal Government. Each mineral lease was negotiated by the Osage National Council and approved by the U.S. Secretary of the Interior. While the government forced allotment of lands and distribution of  plots to tribal members for farming in the early 20th century, the tribe continued to hold their "surplus" land after the distribution. Other tribes were forced to give up such "surplus" and allow for sales to non-Indians. Later the enrolled Osage and their descendants received oil and other mineral royalties as payments based on these "headrights".

The Burbank Oil Field was discovered in May 1920 with the Marland Oil Company's well 1 discovery.  Peak production from the dome was in July 1923 at 88,950 barrels from 1020 wells, with total production of 200 million barrels by the end of 1938.  Most production is from the Burbank Sand at a depth of 2700–3000 feet.

By 1920, the Osage were receiving lucrative revenues from royalties and were counted as the richest people in the country. During the 1920s, Osage County was the site of the infamous Osage Indian murders. Because of the great wealth being generated by oil, an estimated 60 tribal members were killed as whites tried to gain their headrights, royalties or land. The FBI believed that several white husbands of Osage women had committed or ordered murders of their wives.  Other Osage were tricked out of their legal rights by unscrupulous white opportunists. Congress had passed a law in 1921 requiring all Osage of half or more Indian ancestry to have a guardian appointed by the court until the person proved to be "competent." Guardians were appointed by the courts even for minors with living parents. There was extensive corruption as such guardians manipulated people to give or bequeath land to them in order to get access to oil rights.

The Osage called in the FBI to help solve several murders in the Kyle family. Three white men were ultimately convicted and sentenced. But, many murders were never solved. To try to protect the Osage, Congress passed a law in 1925 limiting the inheritance of headrights only to persons who were half or more Osage in ancestry.

Geography

It is the largest county in Oklahoma by area. Most of the county is in the Osage Plains, and consists of open prairie. The eastern part of the county contains the Osage Hills, an extension of the Flint Hills in Kansas. Tallgrass Prairie Preserve is north of Pawhuska.

Holmes Peak is a mountain northwest of Tulsa in Osage County. It was named by the United States Board on Geographic Names on October 5, 1983, for the fictional detective, Sherlock Holmes. The name was proposed by Richard S. Warner.

Gray Horse Creek, Drum Creek and Salt Creek all drain the southwestern part of the county and flow into the Arkansas River, which is part of the county's southern and western boundaries. Eastern Osage County drains into Caney River, Bird Creek, Hominy Creek, and Delaware Creek. All of these streams flow into the Verdigris River.

Lakes and reservoirs in the county include:
 Birch Lake
 Bluestem Lake
 Hulah Lake (Oklahoma)
 Kaw Lake
 Keystone Lake
 Skiatook Lake

In 2012, the Osage Nation took over management of Wah-Sha-She State Park, which includes Hulah Lake, after state budget cuts would have closed it. Hunting is allowed there. The land is owned by the US Army Corps of Engineers, which developed the lake. In 2015, the Osage subleased the renamed Wah-Sha-She Park to the Hulah Lake Osage Association (HLOA), a non-profit group which took on the task of maintaining the park through volunteer efforts.  As of 2020 HLOA still had the park open, supported by campground fees.

It is the most populous and the second-largest county geographically (after Corson County, South Dakota) of the six U.S. counties that lie entirely within an Indian reservation. (The six counties in descending order of area are Corson; Osage; Oglala Lakota and Todd in South Dakota; Sioux in North Dakota; and Mahnomen in Minnesota.) Three other counties, Thurston in Nebraska; and Dewey and Ziebach in South Dakota, lie entirely in parts of two separate Indian reservations. A total of nine US counties lie entirely within reservation territory. Dewey County is slightly larger in area than Osage.

Adjacent counties
 Cowley County, Kansas (northwest)
 Chautauqua County, Kansas (north)
 Washington County (east)
 Tulsa County (southeast)
 Pawnee County (southwest)
 Kay County (west)
 Noble County (west)

Demographics

As of the 2010 United States Census, there were 47,472 people, 18,205 households, and 12,972 families residing in the county.  The population density was 20.6 people per square mile (8/km2).  There were 21,143 housing units at an average density of 9.2 per square mile (3.5/km2).  The racial makeup of the county was 66% White, 11.4% Black or African American, 14.4% Native American, 0.3% Asian, less than 0.1% Pacific Islander, 0.8% from other races, and 7.1% from two or more races.  Almost 3% of the population were Hispanic or Latino of any race.

There were 18,205 households, out of which 32.6% included children under the age of 18, 54.2% were married couples living together, 12% had a female householder with no husband present, 5.1% had a male householder with no wife present, and 28.7% were non-families.  Individuals living alone accounted for 24.8% of households and 10.8% had someone living alone who was 65 years of age or older.  The average household size was 2.53 and the average family size was 2.99.

In the county, the population was spread out, with 24.3% under the age of 18, 7.4% from 18 to 24, 23.1% from 25 to 44, 29.9% from 45 to 64, and 15.3% who were 65 years of age or older.  The median age was 41.4 years.  For every 100 females, there were 101.39 males.  For every 100 females age 18 and over, there were more than 100 males.

The median income for a household in the county was $42,847, and the median income for a family was $53,815.  Males had a median income of $42,658 versus $32,352 for females.  The per capita income for the county was $21,797.  About 11% of families and 13% of the population were below the poverty line, including 18% of those under age 18 and 11% of those age 65 or over.

Politics

Communities

Cities

 Barnsdall
 Bartlesville (part)
 Hominy
 Pawhuska
 Ponca City (part)
 Sand Springs (part)
 Skiatook (part)
 Shidler
 Tulsa (part)

Towns

 Avant
 Burbank
 Fairfax
 Foraker
 Grainola
 Osage
 Prue
 Webb City
 Wynona

Census-designated places
 Bowring
 McCord
 Nelagoney
 Pershing
 Whippoorwill

Other unincorporated communities
 Carter Nine
 Gray Horse
 Rock
 Webb City
 Wolco

Education
School districts include:

K-12:

 Barnsdall Public Schools
 Bartlesville Public Schools
 Caney Valley Public Schools
 Cleveland Public Schools
 Dewey Public Schools
 Hominy Public Schools
 Pawhuska Public Schools
 Ponca City Public Schools
 Prue Public Schools
 Sand Springs Public Schools
 Shidler Public Schools
 Skiatook Public Schools
 Sperry Public Schools
 Tulsa Public Schools
 Woodland Public Schools
 Wynona Public Schools

Elementary only:

 Anderson Public School
 Avant Public School
 Bowring Public School
 McCord Public School
 Osage Hills Public School

NRHP sites

The following sites in Osage County are listed on the National Register of Historic Places:

 Bank of Bigheart, Barnsdall
 Bank of Burbank, Burbank
 Bank of Hominy, Hominy
 Barnsdall Main Street Well Site, Barnsdall
 Blacksmith's House, Pawhuska
 Chapman-Barnard Ranch Headquarters, Pawhuska
 Chief Ne-Kah-Wah-She-Tun-Kah Grave and Statue, Fairfax
 Pawhuska City Hall, Pawhuska
 Fred and Adeline Drummond House, Hominy
 First National Bank and Masonic Lodge, Fairfax
 Hominy Armory, Hominy
 Hominy Osage Round House, Hominy
 Hominy School, Hominy
 Immaculate Conception Church, Pawhuska
 Lincoln Colored School, Fairfax
 Marland Filling Station, Hominy
 Osage Agency, Pawhuska
 Osage Bank of Fairfax, Fairfax
 Osage County Courthouse, Pawhuska
 Pawhuska Armory, Pawhuska
 Pawhuska Downtown Historic District, Pawhuska
 Wolverine Oil Company Drayage Barn, Avant
 Osage Nation Museum, Pawhuska

In popular culture
It is the setting of Oklahoma native Tracy Letts' play August: Osage County (2007), which won the Pulitzer Prize for Drama and a Tony Award in 2008, and the 2013 movie adaptation of the same name which stars Meryl Streep.
Filming took place in rural Osage County, including Pawhuska, Barnsdall and Bartlesville.

Highways
 L.L. Tisdale Parkway
 Gilcrease Expressway
 U.S. 412
 U.S. 60
 Oklahoma State Highway 99
 Oklahoma State Highway 20
 Oklahoma State Highway 18
 Oklahoma State Highway 11
 Oklahoma State Highway 10
 Oklahoma State Highway 123
 Oklahoma State Highway 97

See also
 August: Osage County (play)
 Osage Indian Murders

References

External links

 2030 Osage County Comprehensive Plan  Retrieved July 25, 2014.
 Osage County Sheriff's Office

 
1907 establishments in Oklahoma
Populated places established in 1907
Tulsa metropolitan area